Marlon Dinger (born 16 June 2001) is a German professional footballer who plays as a centre-back for Sonnenhof Großaspach.

Career
Dinger made his professional debut for Karlsruher SC in the 2. Bundesliga on 19 September 2020, coming on as a substitute in the 88th minute for Robin Bormuth against Hannover 96, which finished as a 2–0 away loss.

References

External links
 
 
 
 

2001 births
Living people
People from Rastatt
Sportspeople from Karlsruhe (region)
Footballers from Baden-Württemberg
German footballers
Association football central defenders
Karlsruher SC players
1. FC Bruchsal players
FC Astoria Walldorf players
SG Sonnenhof Großaspach players
2. Bundesliga players
Oberliga (football) players